Edward Diego "Eddie" Reyes (January 24, 1930 – April 14, 2018) was a Guamanian politician and retired United States Air Force colonel. Reyes served as the 4th Lieutenant Governor of Guam from January 3, 1983, to January 5, 1987, under Governor Ricardo Bordallo, having been elected in 1982 as Bordallo's running mate.

Early life 
He was born on January 24, 1930, to his parents Juan Reyes and Ana Guevara.

Political career

1978 Borallo-Reyes Campaign
In 1978, incumbent Guam Governor Ricardo Bordallo, a Democrat, lost re-election to Republican Paul McDonald Calvo. Four years later, Bordallo, who planned a political comeback, once again announced his candidacy for Governor. Bordallo chose U.S. Air Force Colonel Edward Diego Reyes, a political unknown with no previous experience in elected office as his running mate. Reyes, a Vietnam War veteran with several awards and honors, retired from the U.S. Air Force following a 28-year career in order to enter the race with Bordallo.

1982 Borallo-Reyes Campaign
Bordallo and Reyes were challenged in the 1982 Democratic gubernatorial primary by Bordallo's former Lt. Governor Rudy Sablan and his running mate, Joe Leon Guerrero. However, Bordallo-Reyes easily defeated Sablan in the primary election by 35 percent.

Bordallo and Reyes' campaign utilized the "People First" slogan in the general election campaign against Governor Paul McDonald Calvo. The Bordallo-Reyes defeated incumbent Governor Calvo and his running mate, Peter F. Perez Jr., in the 1982 general election. Bordallo won the race 1,402 votes (approximately 5%) out 28,996 votes cast. Bordallo and Reyes were sworn in as Governor and Lt. Governor on January 3, 1983.

1986 Borallo-Reyes Campaign
Bordallo and Reyes sought re-election to a second term in 1986. However, Governor Bordallo was indicted in September 1986 on eleven counts of corruption. Lt. Governor Reyes, who continued to support Bordallo as his running mate, was not implicated in the scandal and emerged from it with his reputation unscathed. However, the chances that Bordallo-Reyes ticket would be re-elected were severely diminished by Bordallo's indictment.
 
Bordallo-Reyes lost re-election to Republican Joseph Franklin Ada and his running mate, Frank Blas, in the general election on November 4, 1986. Ada defeated Governor Bordallo by 2,581 votes (7.6%).

Guam Legislature
Reyes served in the 20th and the 22nd Guam Legislatures.

1994 Reyes-Nelson Campaign
In 1994, Reyes unsuccessfully ran for Governor of Guam, choosing Gloria Nelson as his running mate for Lt. Governor.

Personal life and death 
Reyes was married to Guadalupe "Lupe" Cruz and has four children (Johnny, Paul, Barbara and Lauren).

Reyes died on April 14, 2018, in a hospital in Honolulu, Hawaii.

References

External links 
 

|-

1930 births
2018 deaths
20th-century American politicians
Chamorro people
Guamanian Democrats
Guamanian military personnel
Lieutenant Governors of Guam
Members of the Legislature of Guam
People from Hagåtña, Guam
United States Air Force colonels
United States Air Force personnel of the Vietnam War